Royal Consort Sug-ui of the Onyang Bang clan (Hangul: 숙의 방씨, Hanja: 淑儀 方氏; ? – 1878) was a concubine of King Cheoljong of Joseon.

Biography
On February 22, 1851, Lady Bang gave birth to their daughter, who died at a young age. In 1853, she gave birth to a second daughter, but she too died soon after.

When Royal Consort Sug-ui passed away in 1878 (15th year of King Gojong's reign), she was first buried in Hawolgok-dong, Seongbuk District, Seoul, but in 1969, her tomb was moved to Goyang, Gyeonggi Province.

On May 26, 1970, her tomb become the Korean Historic Site No. 200.

In popular culture
Portrayed by Lee Min-ah in the 1975 TBC TV Series King's First Love.

References

Year of birth unknown
1878 deaths
Royal consorts of the Joseon dynasty
Onyang Bang clan